Anne Margaret Coke, Viscountess Anson (25 January 1779 – 23 May 1843), was an English painter, the daughter of Thomas Coke, 1st Earl of Leicester of Holkham, and wife of Thomas Anson, 1st Viscount Anson.

Personal life
Anne Margaret Coke was born at Holkam Hall on 25 January 1779 to Thomas Coke, 1st Earl of Leicester of Holkham, and Jane Dutton. Anne had an older sister, Jane, born in 1777, and a younger sister, Elizabeth born in 1795, one year after Anne was married. Jane was married by that time, too. Her mother was an abolitionist, spent her allowance on donations to the poor and theater tickets for her servants. Jane Dutton also believed in the importance of a good education for her children.

At the age of 15, Anne Margaret Coke was married to 27-year-old Thomas Anson, 1st Viscount Anson, in September 1794. He was a member of parliament, worth £22,000 per year, and heir to Shugborough estate in Staffordshire. The Duke of Sussex said that he was a "true manly, noble, splendid fellow, possessing much of the real English character, sound sense, and although perhaps hurried away a little too much by country sports, has a great deal of good in him."

According to Susanna Wade Martins, Anne was described as "thin, excitable, energetic, never quiet, constantly getting into quarrels, but always ready to help others. Dawson Turner described her as a woman of sweet character and a pleasing personality.

Anson gave birth to eleven children, four by the time she was 20 years of age.

She died 23 May 1843 in London. Her tomb, in Colwich, Surrey, was sculpted by John Francis.

Artist
Susanna Wade Martins in Coke of Norfolk (1754–1842) states that Anne was likely taught to draw by Thomas Gainsborough in Norfolk and London. One of her paintings of a milk girl was made after one of Gainsborough's paintings. She was said to have made a painting of a nest of owls that was considered "very well done" by Benjamin Haydon. Mrs. Powys, who visited Shugborough in 1800, stated that competent works by Anson were in every room of the house, including three full-length paintings of her children. 

 Animals Sheltering in a Storm, after Philip James de Loutherbourg
 Thomas William Anson (1795–1854), Later 1st Earl of Lichfield, Anne Margaret Anson (1796–1882), Later Countess of Rosebery, and George Anson (1797–1857), Later Major General and Commander in Chief of India, as Children
 Elijah and the Ravens, after Teniers

Notes

References

External links

1778 births
1843 deaths
19th-century English painters
English women painters
British viscountesses
Daughters of British earls
19th-century British women artists
Anne
19th-century English women